Peter Alexander Ferdinand Maximilian Neumayer (30 June 1926 – 12 February 2011), commonly known as Peter Alexander, was an Austrian actor, singer and one of the most popular entertainers in the German-language world between the 1950s and his retirement. His fame emerged in the 1950s and 1960s through popular film comedies and successful recordings, predominantly of Schlager and operetta repertory. Later, Alexander established himself as the acclaimed host of television shows. His career as a live singer touring the German language countries lasted until 1991, while he continued his television work until 1996.

Life and career
Born in Vienna, Alexander attended the Max Reinhardt Seminar for actors until 1948 and then began his career in acting. He starred in several musical comedies, including Liebe, Tanz und 1000 Schlager and Peter schießt den Vogel ab. He recorded Ralph Benatzky's operetta Im weißen Rößl, singing the lead role of Leopold Brandmeyer. He then performed in the 1960 movie version of the operetta. He later starred in the Count Bobby movies and the Lümmel-series.

In the 1970s, Alexander started a second career as a TV host and entertainer. From 1969, the German TV station ZDF started to air a new colour version which was broadcast until 1996. The Peter Alexander Show has been seen by more than 38 million viewers and has averaged a 71% viewing rate.

After his death, Media Control Charts named him the biggest singles artist ever with 459 songs having charted on the German singles chart. The single "Und manchmal weinst du sicher ein paar Tränen" had the longest run with 34 weeks on that chart, while 2 other songs, "Der letzte Walzer" and "Liebesleid", were able to reach the No. 1 position. Alexander won 10 Bambi Awards and in 1996 was awarded a Bambi for lifetime achievement.

Alexander married Hilde Haagen in 1952; they had two children, Susanne Neumayer-Haidinger (1958–2009), an artist, and Michael Neumayer (1963–2019). Alexander was widowed in 2003.

Alexander died on 12 February 2011, aged 84, in his native Vienna.

Filmography

Decorations and awards
 Grand Decoration of Honour for Services to the Republic of Austria (1985)
 Austrian Cross of Honour for Science and Art, 1st class (1974)
 Ring of honour of Vienna (1984)
 Golden Camera (1970, 1980, 1984 (Germany); 1979 (Austria)) as the best music star of a decade
 Super Golden Camera 1979 (Germany) as the biggest star of all time, with participation of over 11 million readers of Hörzu
 Bambi Award (1970, 1971, 1972, 1973, 1974, 1977, 1978, 1987, 1990; 1996 for his lifetime achievement)
 Golden Europe (1969, 1974, 1979)
  (1966, 1973, 1974 and 1976); Silberner Bildschirm (1970 and 1971)
 Bronze Bravo Otto (1971)
 Gold Decoration for Services to the City of Vienna (1971)
 Lion of RTL Radio, a total of 9 prizes in bronze, silver and gold (1973)
 Honorary Lion as the best singer
 Golden Microphone (1966) for best male music star in European show business
 Rose Hill award (1992) for having written Austrian film history
 Award of the City of Cologne (1976) for 14 completely sold-out events at the Cologne Sporthalle
 Hermann Löns Gold Medal
 Golden Romy (1992)
 Platinum Romy (1993)
 Other awards were: Lieber Augustin of Vienna (1968), the Golden Bear (1973), Golden Rathausmann (1970), Golden Plate of German gastronomy (1973), Golden Cleo as the most popular star in Austria (1986), German Record Award (1980), Silver Plate of Robert Stolz Foundation in (1980)
 4th place in the list of the 50 most important Austrians of the last 50 years in a reader poll of the daily Kurier (2004)
 Induction into the Echo Hall of Fame (2011)
 Naming of Peter-Alexander-Platz in Döbling (19th district of Vienna, 2012)

Bibliography
 Michael Wenk & Barbara Loehr: Peter Alexander – Das tat ich alles aus Liebe. Wien: Ueberreuter, 2006
 "Peter Alexander" entry, German version of Microsoft Encarta Encyclopedia 2005.

References

External links
 
 

1926 births
2011 deaths
20th-century Austrian male actors
20th-century Austrian male singers
Austrian male film actors
Schlager musicians
Musicians from Vienna
Recipients of the Grand Decoration for Services to the Republic of Austria
Recipients of the Austrian Cross of Honour for Science and Art, 1st class
Recipients of the Bambi (prize)
Recipients of the Romy (TV award)
Luftwaffenhelfer